May Wafic Sardouk (born June 4, 1963) is a Lebanese Olympic athlete. She represented Lebanon in 1988 Summer Olympics in Seoul, and came in last in her heat in round one.

Olympic participation

Seoul 1988
Sardouk and Nancy Khalaf were the only female participants for Lebanon in that tournament among a total of 21 participant for Lebanon.
Athletics – Women's 400 metres – Round One

References

External links
 

1963 births
Living people
Lebanese female sprinters
Olympic athletes of Lebanon
Athletes (track and field) at the 1988 Summer Olympics
Olympic female sprinters